Chris Charlton (born July 4, 1963) is a German-born, retired Canadian politician from the City of Hamilton, Ontario. As a New Democrat, she served as the member of Parliament for Hamilton Mountain from 2006 until 2015.

Background
Charlton was born in Dortmund, Germany and immigrated to Canada with her parents in 1975. She attended the University of Western Ontario for undergraduate studies and then McMaster University to pursue a master's degree in Political Science. During this time, she became active with the New Democratic Youth club on campus. Soon after, Bob Rae and the New Democrats came to power in Ontario, and Charlton received a job as a political advisor with the government, where her husband, Brian Charlton (whom she married in 1992), was a cabinet minister. When the Progressive Conservatives defeated Rae's government in the 1995 provincial election.

Politics
At the time the Hamilton Mountain New Democrats held their nomination meeting to declare a candidate to run against Beth Phinney in 1997, Charlton had become a Teaching Assistant at U of T and had nearly completed her studies. Though only 33 at the time, she had already served as an advisor to Bob Rae's government, and went unopposed in the nomination. On election night, she placed 4th out of 6 candidates, which would be the lowest she would ever poll in an election campaign.

Over the course of the next 9 years, she would run in the 1999 provincial election and the 2003 provincial election, the Hamilton municipal election of 2000 and two federal elections in 1997 and 2004.

Just prior to the 2006 election, she was the Director of Community Relations with Big Brothers and Big Sisters of Canada, but resigned her position to stand again, this time against Ward 7 Councillor Bill Kelly, who she attempted to unseat in the Hamilton municipal election of 2000. Charlton won that race by a 6-point margin, and retook the riding for the New Democrats after 17 years of Liberal representation.

In 2008, Charlton faced another former Ward 7 councillor, Terry Anderson of the Conservatives and local lawyer Tyler Banham of the Liberals. Despite an aggressive internet campaign on behalf of the Liberals, the race became a New Democrat-Conservative match, which saw Charlton increase voter support despite a lower voter turnout than in 2006.

Charlton announce on December 5, 2014 that she was not going to run for re-election in the next federal election in a year's time, after almost a decade in parliament and 25 years in politics.

In the 2009 Ontario New Democratic Leadership race, Charlton officially endorsed Andrea Horwath for leader, who would win the position on the third ballot.

Electoral history

Federal

Provincial

Municipal

|- style="background-color:#fcfcfc;"
!rowspan="2" colspan="2" style="text-align:center;" |Candidate
!colspan="3" style="text-align:center;" |Popular vote
|- style="background-color:#fcfcfc;"
| style="text-align:center;" | Votes
| style="text-align:center;" |%
| style="text-align:center;" |±%
|-
| style="background-color:#FF0800;" |
| style="text-align:left;" | Bill Kelly (incumbent)
| style="text-align:right;" |10,482	
| style="text-align:right;" |60.83%
| style="text-align:right;" |+-%
|-
| style="background-color:#FF7E00;" |
| style="text-align:left;" | Chris Charlton
| style="text-align:right;" |6,011
| style="text-align:right;" |34.88%
| style="text-align:right;" |n/a
|-
| style="background-color:#0047AB;" |
| style="text-align:left;" | Mark Allan Whittle
| style="text-align:right;" |740
| style="text-align:right;" |4.29%
| style="text-align:right;" |+-%
|-
| style="text-align:right;background-color:#FFFFFF;" colspan="2" |Total votes
| style="text-align:right;background-color:#FFFFFF;" |17,233
| style="text-align:right;background-color:#FFFFFF;" |100%
| style="text-align:right;background-color:#FFFFFF;" |
|- 
| style="text-align:right;background-color:#FFFFFF;" colspan="2" |Registered voters
| style="text-align:right;background-color:#FFFFFF;" |39,377
| style="text-align:right;background-color:#FFFFFF;" |43.76
| style="text-align:right;background-color:#FFFFFF;" |''|- 
| style="text-align:left;" colspan="6" |Note: All Hamilton Municipal Elections are officially non-partisan.  Note: Candidate campaign colours are based on the prominent colour used in campaign items (signs, literature, etc.)and are used as a visual differentiation between candidates.
|- 
| style="text-align:left;" colspan="13" |Sources:''' "Expressway, balance sheet weigh heavy in Ward 7", October 30, 2003 Thursday Final Edition, LOCAL; Pg. A08, 948 words
|}

References

External links

1963 births
German emigrants to Canada
Women members of the House of Commons of Canada
Living people
McMaster University alumni
Members of the House of Commons of Canada from Ontario
New Democratic Party MPs
Politicians from Hamilton, Ontario
University of Toronto alumni
University of Western Ontario alumni
Women in Ontario politics
21st-century Canadian politicians
21st-century Canadian women politicians